Charles Eric (Chuck) Moon (May 6, 1923 – April 9, 2001) was an American politician in the state of Washington. He served in the Washington House of Representatives from 1963 to 1977 and 1983 to 1985

References

2001 deaths
1923 births
People from Sheridan, Wyoming
Democratic Party members of the Washington House of Representatives
20th-century American politicians